Quispe is a common Quechua surname and, more rarely, given name. The word (qispi in Southern Quechua and kishpi in Kichwa) means "free".

People with the surname

Art and photography 

 Diego Quispe Tito (1611–1681), Peruvian painter
 Nicario Jiménez Quispe (born 1957), Peruvian-American retablo maker

Music 

 Lorenzo Palacios Quispe (1950–1994), Peruvian singer and musician
 Wendy Sulca Quispe (born 1996), Peruvian singer

Politics and law 

 Felipe Quispe (1942–2021) Bolivian historian and politician
 Rafael Quispe (born 1969), Bolivian indigenous leader and politician
 Santos Quispe (born 1982), Bolivian doctor and politician
 Iris Flores Quispe (born 2000), Bolivian politician

Sports 

 Fortunato Quispe Mendoza, Bolivian-born Dominican Republic football manager
 Crispin Quispe (born 1946), Bolivian long-distance runner
 Rafael Farfán Quispe (born 1975), Peruvian footballer
 Rosemary Quispe (born 1983), Bolivian long-distance runner
 Ronald Quispe (born 1988), Bolivian race-walker

Other 

 Quispe Sisa (1518–1559), Inca princess
 Severo Aparicio Quispe (1923–2013), Peruvian friar
 Ciro Quispe López (born 1973), Peruvian bishop
 Manuel Quispe (died 2004), Q'ero elder and medicine man

Quechuan-language surnames